Tom Williams (born December 22, 1969) is an American college football coach and former player. He was the head football coach at Greenhill School, a position he assumed in July 2013, until early 2017. Williams served as head coach at Yale University from 2009 to 2011, compiling a record of 16–14. He was a linebacker at Stanford University.

Playing career
Williams attended Trinity Valley School in his hometown of Fort Worth, Texas. During his tenure at Trinity Valley he earned all-state honors in football, basketball, and baseball. Williams graduated from high school in 1988.

Williams went on to pursue academics at Stanford University. While pursuing academics, Williams was also a four-year starter and letterman for the Stanford Cardinal. He played linebacker for the Stanford Cardinal from 1989–1992 and served as a team captain his senior year. He was a two-time member of the Academic All-Pac-10 team and an honorable mention for All-Pac-10 his senior season.

Coaching career
Williams worked as an assistant coach at Stanford University, the University of Hawaii, San Jose State University, and University of Washington before joining the Jacksonville Jaguars as an assistant coach from 2006 to 2008.

He accepted an offer, in January 2009, to become the head football coach at Yale; he was the first black head football coach in the school's history and the second in the history of the Ivy League.

On November 17, 2011, the Rhodes Scholarship pursuits of Yale's Patrick Witt brought attention to Williams's misinterpretated claim that he was also a Rhode Scholarship finalist. The truth of the matter is that Williams was urged by two of his teachers and football coach to get interviewed, as he would be the perfect candidate. The problem was that the first interview was at the same time as tryouts for the San Francisco 49ers. As told, Williams went to the tryouts instead. That he skipped his final interview in order to attend an NFL tryout is a mixture of half truths mixed with the meddling of Harvard graduate and writer for The Washington Post, Peter May. Right before the rival game between Yale and Harvard, May had obtained some information and painted the story in a different light. The public outcry was enough to start an investigation. The investigation lead to Rhodes Scholarship officials stating that they have no record of Tom Williams applying for a Rhodes Scholarship, and his name does not appear in the scholarship's trust databases. Yale launched an internal review on the matter as well.

Williams stepped down as Yale's head football coach due to the overwhelming pressure from Yale. He also admitted that he had never applied for a Rhodes Scholarship.

As of February 21, 2012 Williams was named University of Texas at El Paso's safeties coach. He served on the UTEP defensive staff under head football coach Mike Price.

Personal life
Williams is married to Tonya; they have four children: Grace, Tom (Tre), Ana, and Lauren. He has a master's degree in university administration from Stanford University. Williams graduated from Trinity Valley School in Fort Worth, Texas.

Head coaching record

References

1969 births
Living people
American football linebackers
FIU Panthers football coaches
Hawaii Rainbow Warriors football coaches
Jacksonville Jaguars coaches
San Jose State Spartans football coaches
Stanford Cardinal football coaches
Stanford Cardinal football players
Washington Huskies football coaches
UTEP Miners football coaches
Yale Bulldogs football coaches
Sportspeople from Fort Worth, Texas